Abdullah bin Yeop Noordin (sometimes spelt as Abdullah Noordin or Abdullah Nordin) was a Malaysian football player who represented the Malaysian national football team in the late 1960s.

Career Overview
He start played for Perak FA and Selangor FA in Malaysia's domestic competition.

In 1959, he was selected for the inaugural Asian Youth Championship with Ng Boon Bee and became runners-up. 

He was also a part of the Malaya player that winning bronze medals in the 1962 Asian Games.

Abdullah captained Malaysia from 1966 to 1969, winning the 1968 Pestabola Merdeka tournament.

After retired from playing, he became a coach for selangor youth in Burnley Cup and guiding Selangor to won 1973 Malaysia Cup. In 1988–89 Season, he  managed Perak FA.

Honour

Player
Perak
Malaysia Cup runner-up:1959

Selangor
Malaysia Cup: 1961, 1962, 1963, 1966, 1968, 1969
Malaysia FAM Cup: 1961, 1962, 1966, 1968
Asian Champion Club Tournament runner up: 1967

Malaysia U19
AFC Youth Championship runner up: 1959, 1960

Malaysia
 Sea Games gold medal: 1961
 Asian Games bronze medal: 1962
Pestabola Merdeka: 1968

Head Coach
Selangor 
Malaysia Cup: 1973

References

External links
  'I quit' Noordin says: Work, family now The Straits Times, 5 April 1968, Page 20 - National Library of Singapore
Meraikan 100 Tahun Piala Malaysia – Piala Malaya 1962 & 1963 (In Malay) - Legasi Lagenda at Wayback Machine
Memories keep Thanabalan giving back to the game - Level Field at Wayback Machine

Malaysian footballers
People from Perak
Perak F.C. players
2014 deaths
Malaysia international footballers
Selangor FA players
Association football defenders
1941 births